The Mittlere Petermann Range is one of the Petermann Ranges in Antarctica, extending north–south for  from the Johnson Peaks to Store Svarthorn Peak, in the Wohlthat Mountains, Queen Maud Land. The range was discovered and plotted from air photos by the Third German Antarctic Expedition of 1938–39, and so named by them for its middle position in the northern part of the Petermann Ranges.

References

Mountain ranges of Queen Maud Land
Princess Astrid Coast